The List of schools in Greater Manchester, England is divided by metropolitan borough: